Whitney Tyson (born Bunny Fowler) is a Filipina actress, singer and comedian, best known for her role as Elizabeth in FPJ's Ang Probinsyano.

Personal life
Tyson was born Bunny Fowler in Angeles, Pampanga, the only child of an African-American father and a Filipino mother.

Career
Tyson's stage name is a portmanteau of the late singer Whitney Houston and the former heavyweight boxer Mike Tyson. Despite initially facing racism for her African-American heritage, Tyson embraced her ethnicity and used it as an asset in entering show business. She usually played supporting roles as sidekicks or household helpers in various films and television series. Her career eventually declined over the years, to the point of making appearances in various fiestas to make ends meet as a destitute living in a shanty under Nagtahan Bridge in Manila. Tyson later relocated to a resettlement area in Bulacan along with her mother.

Following an interview with Korina Sanchez on the weekly magazine show Rated K, Tyson made a comeback in the ABS-CBN teleserye FPJ's Ang Probinsyano with a supporting role as Elizabeth, a maid working at the Presidential Palace.

Filmography

Television

Film

Awards and nominations

References

External links
 

Living people
Filipino film actresses
Filipino television actresses
Filipino women comedians
Filipino people of African-American descent
Kapampangan people
People from Bulacan
People from Pampanga
People from Sampaloc, Manila
People from San Jose del Monte
Tagalog people
20th-century Filipino actresses
21st-century Filipino actresses
Year of birth missing (living people)